David Mitchell Jones 
(born July 23, 1992) is an American Twitch streamer and musician.

Career
Jones began streaming on Twitch (then known as Justin.tv) in 2011. He primarily played World of Warcraft player-versus-player combat. He would later begin streaming IRL (in real life) content. In 2015, Jones' stream averaged 5,000 concurrent viewers.

Throughout his streaming career, Jones has been involved in controversies which resulted in his Twitch account receiving lengthy bans. In December of 2017, Jones received a temporary ban for calling one of his viewers an anti-gay slur. In February 2018, Jones received another temporary ban following a donation message containing a racial slur being sent in by a viewer. In June 2019, Jones received a one-week ban for using his phone while driving. In September 2019, Jones received a one-month ban after showing private messages on stream where he used a racial slur. After his ban expired the following month, it was revealed that his Twitch partnership status was revoked.

On April 19, 2021, Jones released a song titled "Now that you're gone," a tribute song dedicated to Byron "Reckful" Bernstein, a Twitch streamer and close friend of Jones who died of suicide in 2020. Two days later, Jones announced that he would be taking an indefinite break from streaming. In a YouTube video titled "Treading New Waters," he stated, ""My heart is just not in it anymore, and quite frankly every time I stream, I'm just reminded of all the times that will not happen again… Truly I had some magical moments as a streamer and those days are over." He also announced his intention to pursue a career in music.

Jones released his debut extended play "If I Could Go Back" on July 23, 2021. In a press release, Jones stated, "I want to write songs to save people who are struggling, just like I've been. Thank you to all of the real ones from Twitch who have supported me in this journey into music. I hope the music can help at least one other person." He returned to Twitch that same day, holding a release party where he performed the EP's songs live.

Personal life
Jones currently resides in Austin, Texas. 
Jones has stated that he suffers from bouts of anxiety and depression.

Discography

Extended plays

Singles

References

Living people
1992 births
People from Maryland
Twitch (service) streamers
People from Austin, Texas
Musicians from Maryland